Hebbe Falls is situated at  about 10 km away from the famous hill station Kemmangundi in Karnataka, India.  This waterfalls is inside a coffee estate and can be reached either by walk or four-wheeler.  Hebbe Falls gushes down from a height of 551 ft in two stages to form Dodda Hebbe (Big Falls) and Chikka Hebbe (Small Falls.)

The option of trekking is available (as of Aug 2016), but the place is filled with leeches especially in the rainy season. The best option is to take a government approved forest jeep which goes through private estates. The last kilometer needs to be trekked in order to reach the falls.

Best Ways To Reach

By road: Birur is a small town located in Kadur taluk, plenty of connectivity by buses plying between Bangalore-Chickmagalore or Bangalore-Shimoga buses. If you are driving yourself, the town is located on beautiful National Highway 206 (a.k.a. State Highway 68; SH 68 or BH Road; Bangalore-Honnavar Road). From Birur, you have to switch to a local mode of transportation such as a local taxi or private buses.

By train: Again, Birur is a junction located on the southern railway route between Bangalore-Shimoga, Bangalore-Davanagere. From Birur, you have to switch to a local mode of transportation such as a local taxi or private buses.

By air: Nearest airports are at Bangalore and Mangalore, and it is a 5-hour journey by road. Refer the above paragraph 'By Road'.

Nearest Place To Stay

Kadur offers plenty of decent hotels (AC/Non-AC), especially on KM Road. Chickmagalore is also a wonderful option if you are looking for a city, coffee plantation view will be a bonus plus plenty of attractions to visit nearby.

See also 
 List of waterfalls in India
 List of waterfalls in India by height

References

External links
WikiMapia

Waterfalls of Karnataka
Geography of Chikkamagaluru district
Tourist attractions in Chikkamagaluru district
Waterfalls of India